The CS/LR35 (military designation QBU-202 and QBU-203) is a type of bolt-action sniper rifle designed and manufactured by Chinese company Norinco. Developed from CS/LR4, the weapon is chambered with either 7.62×51mm cartridge or 8.6×70mm round in a 5-round box magazine. The rifle features a free-floating barrel and specifically designed munition that improves accuracy.

Design and development
CS/LR35 is the further development of the CS/LR4 sniper rifle system. CS/LR35 is available in two versions chambered in either 7.62×51mm NATO or 8.6×70mm (.338 Lapua Magnum). Improvements include reinforced material for the barrel, lightweight rifle body, fully adjustable folding stock, and CS/DEL3A high precision cartridge in a 5-round box magazine.

The 8.6×70mm variant of the rifle can be differentiated by its slightly longer barrel with a handguard that only has four ventilation holes whereas the 7.62 variant has seven smaller ones.

8.6×70mm variant of the CS/LR35 received designation QBU-202 with its scope designated QMK-201 variable zoom optics. 7.62×51mm variant of the CS/LR35 received designation QBU-203 with its scope designated QMK-201A.

Variants
CS/LR35 Improved version of CS/LR4. Chambered in 7.62×51mm and 8.6×70mm Lapua Magnum.
QBU-202 Military designation for CS/LR35 chambered in 8.6×70mm. In service with People's Liberation Army Ground Force.
QBU-203 Military designation for CS/LR35 chambered in 7.62×51mm ammo.

Users
:
People's Liberation Army Ground Force - CS/LR35, QBU-202, QBU-203.

See also
 CS/LR4

References

Sniper rifles of the People's Republic of China
7.62×51mm NATO rifles
.338 Lapua Magnum rifles
Bolt-action rifles